Paavo Jaakko Matias Korhonen (5 June 1928 – 29 September 2019) was a Finnish Nordic skier who won the individual titles at the 1957 Holmenkollen ski festival and 1958 FIS Nordic World Ski Championships. He competed at the 1952, 1956 and 1960 Olympics and placed fourth, fourth and ninth, respectively. At the 1952 games he also finished 14th in the 18 km cross-country skiing race, and in 1960 served as the Finnish Olympic flag bearer at the opening ceremony. Korhonen lived in his home town of Joutseno, where a statue is erected in his honor.

Cross-country skiing results

Olympic Games

References

External links

Holmenkollen winners since 1892 – click Vinnere for downloadable pdf file 

1928 births
2019 deaths
People from Lappeenranta
Finnish Lutherans
Finnish male Nordic combined skiers
Finnish male cross-country skiers
Olympic Nordic combined skiers of Finland
Olympic cross-country skiers of Finland
Cross-country skiers at the 1952 Winter Olympics
Nordic combined skiers at the 1952 Winter Olympics
Nordic combined skiers at the 1956 Winter Olympics
Nordic combined skiers at the 1960 Winter Olympics
Holmenkollen Ski Festival winners
FIS Nordic World Ski Championships medalists in Nordic combined
20th-century Lutherans
Sportspeople from South Karelia